|}

The Desert Orchid Chase is a Grade 2 National Hunt steeplechase in Great Britain which is open to horses aged four years or older. It is run at Kempton Park over a distance of about 2 miles (3,219 metres), and during its running there are twelve fences to be jumped. The race is scheduled to take place each year in late December during the course's Christmas Festival.

The race was first run on 27 December 2006. It is named in memory of Desert Orchid, a popular racehorse who died several weeks earlier. Desert Orchid won Kempton's most prestigious event, the King George VI Chase, four times between 1986 and 1990. His ashes were scattered at the racecourse on the day of this race's inaugural running. The event has replaced the Castleford Chase in the National Hunt calendar as a Grade 2 chase over 2 miles.

Winners

See also
 Horse racing in Great Britain
 List of British National Hunt races

References
 Racing Post:

 pedigreequery.com – Desert Orchid Chase – Kempton.

National Hunt races in Great Britain
Kempton Park Racecourse
National Hunt chases
Recurring sporting events established in 2006
2006 establishments in England